The Oncologic Drugs Advisory Committee (ODAC) receives requests for technical and clinical evaluation of new drugs by the U.S. Food and Drug Administration (FDA).  The committee, consisting of members from academic and clinical oncology biostatistics, the general public, and the pharmaceutical industry, makes non-binding recommendations to both the CDER and CBER divisions of the FDA about the advisability of approving new medications to treat cancer.

References
Oncologic Drugs Advisory Committee, official webpage: https://www.fda.gov/AdvisoryCommittees/CommitteesMeetingMaterials/Drugs/OncologicDrugsAdvisoryCommittee/default.htm

External links
FDA Advisory Committees Calendar (including ODAC): https://www.fda.gov/AdvisoryCommittees/Calendar/default.htm

Food and Drug Administration
National agencies for drug regulation
Regulators of biotechnology products
Pharmacy organizations in the United States
Cancer organizations based in the United States